Verkhotor is a rural locality (a selo) and the administrative centre of Verkhotorsky Selsoviet, Ishimbaysky District, Bashkortostan, Russia. The population was 818 as of 2010. There are 29 streets.

Geography 
Verkhotor is located 41 km southeast of Ishimbay (the district's administrative centre) by road. Kuznetsovsky is the nearest rural locality.

References 

Rural localities in Ishimbaysky District
Ufa Governorate